TOTM can stand for:

 Theater of the Mind
 TOTM United States military ration
 Take Over the Moon, extended play by Chinese boy group WayV
 Tomb of the Mask